Jacques von Polier (born 5 September 1979 in Paris) is a French designer based in Russia. He has collaborated on various artistic and design projects and heads the creative and design department of the "Petrodvorets Watch Factory - Raketa".
With David Henderson-Stewart, they are the keystone of restructuring and rebranding Russia's historical watch brand "Raketa".

Biography
In 1999, von Polier was appointed a UNESCO Goodwill Ambassador by Doudou Diène, then Director of the Division of Inter-cultural Projects. Polier took part with Julien Delpech in a one-year expedition in Central Asia with the support of the UNESCO.  In 2000, he had his first photo exhibition at the UNESCO headquarters in Paris.  In 2010, von Polier had a Design Exhibition in Moscow supported by businessman Gideon Weinbaum.

A bestselling author, von Polier is author of the French-language book Davaï ! sur les chemins de l'Eurasie about Russia and Eurasia, published in 2002 by Éditions Robert Laffont.

In 2011, he won an election organized by the Russian press of the "Top 50 of Saint-Petersburg's most famous people" for fashion.

In 2012, von Polier had the main role in the Ukrainian TV serial Princes Undercover (in ) on Ukrainian channel 1+1.

In 2014, he designed the largest watch mechanism in the world Raketa Monumental, which is installed in central Moscow at Lubyanka Square. Raketa and von Polier were joined by the mechanical engineer Florian Schlumpf for production and technical supervision.

References 

1979 births
Living people
Russian fashion designers
Fashion
Designers